The Duquesne was a 90-gun Touville-class sail and steam ship of the line of the French Navy.

She took part in the Baltic theatre of the Crimean War, shelling Sweaborg on 10 August 1855. She later took part in the French Intervention in Mexico as a troop ship.

She was used as a barracks hulk until 1887.

References

 Jean-Michel Roche, Dictionnaire des Bâtiments de la flotte de guerre française de Colbert à nos jours, tome I

Ships of the line of the French Navy
1853 ships